Pocket Kingdom: Own the World is a mobile Massively Multiplayer Online Game for the Nokia N-Gage, by Sega. The game is a spiritual sequel to an earlier SEGA game, Dragon Force, which was for the Sega Saturn.

The theme is somewhat atypical for a video game, since it makes fun of the usual conventions of MMORPGs: here, every character knows they are in a video game, talks in leet-speak, and even the plot itself is about replacing three griefers who were banned from a high score table.

The game features both online (using the N-Gage Arena) and offline modes; both are similar, but in the online mode you can find other players and talk to or attack them – or be attacked by them. The crafting system is extensive – according to the authors, there are more than 50,000 possible object combinations.

Most of the game consists of buying units, equipping them, setting battle tactics, and sending them into battles. With experience, and using crafted "emblems", characters can be upgraded into more powerful and varied classes.

Reception

The game received "average" reviews according to the review aggregation website Metacritic.

References

External links
Website on the Webarchive

External links
 Pocket Kingdom FAQs and item lists at Warcry
 Unofficial FAQ
 

2004 video games
Massively multiplayer online role-playing games
N-Gage games
Sega video games
Nokia games
Video games developed in Japan